Traynor is a brand of bass amplifiers and guitar amplifiers, the first brand formed by Yorkville Sound. The Traynor brand, named for founder Peter Traynor, began in 1963 with the Dynabass bass amplifier, a rental product.  Traynor first became popular in Canada by providing less expensive versions of the circuits used in Marshall and Fender amplifiers of the time.  The revived brand now produces a wide range of electric, acoustic, and bass guitar amps.

History
In 1963 Traynor amps were designed by Peter Traynor, a music shop (Long & McQuade) repairman who had been customizing amplifiers as a way to save costs for the business.  Through experimentation and experience, Traynor developed a bass guitar amplifier that he called the Traynor Dynabass.  By the end of 1963, Traynor was selling the Dynabass amps along with matching 15-inch speaker cabinets, as well as Traynor portable columnar public address (PA) speakers based on a reference book of 1930s RCA commercial loudspeaker designs.  Soon a business partnership to sell these amps had formed between Traynor and Jack Long, the man who owned the music store that Traynor worked at.  The company was named Yorkville Sound.

In 1964, the Dynabass became the "Bass Master", model "YBA-1", and its associated 15-inch speaker cabinet became the "YS-15". The YBA-1 "Bass Master" circuit is very similar to the Fender Bassman, which in turn inspired the classic Marshall 1959 "Plexi" amplifier. The column loudspeakers were designated "YSC-1" and two additional models were created: the "YSC-2" with fewer, larger drivers to obtain more low-frequency bass extension and the "YSC-3" which was a cut-down version of the YSC-1 for customers who needed a smaller loudspeaker.

Starting in 1965 with the Traynor Hi-Tone, a 2x12  test guitar amp (of which only two were ever made) Pete Traynor began experimenting with guitar amp designs.  The YGA-1 (a 45 watt amp head) and the YGM-1 (a 1x12 20 watt tube combo) were the first products of this research.  Full production of these amps began in 1966, and the release of new models continued until the 70s.

In 1970, Traynor introduced the new Traynor logo (in the shape of a parallelogram) that was less prone to having the initial 'T' and final 'r' break off to become "rayno".  In 1976, Peter Traynor left Yorkville Sound, suffering from a bad back. The Traynor brand would be slowly phased out over the next 17 years until its reintroduction in 2000.

In 2011, Traynor products are manufactured in Pickering, Ontario.

Traynor products

In 2000, Yorkville Sound reintroduced the Traynor brand in with the YCV40 (Custom Valve) model. The brand has a wide product range including DynaGain solid state guitar amplifiers, International amplifiers, Bass Master bass amplifiers, Keyboard amplifiers and an acoustic guitar amplifier line.

Traynor International Guitar Amps

This line of solid state amplifiers are inexpensive foreign manufactured solid state amps, though the TVM10 is the sole battery-operated amplifier offered by Traynor.
 TSM10 – 10-watt, 5-inch
 TGM15 – 15-watt, 8-inch
 TGM20 – 20-watt, 7-inch
 TRM30 – 30-watt, 10-inch
 TRM40 – 40-watt, 2x8-inch (2 x 20 watts x 8 inch)
 TVM10 – 15-watt, 6-inch, battery-powered amplifier

Traynor Solid State Guitar Amplifiers

This line of solid state amplifiers with tube emulation provides analog-based amplification with special circuitry to emulate the compression and dynamics of vacuum tubes. They are equipped with Celestion speakers (except the discontinued DG-65R/D models).
DG10 – 10 Watt, Auxiliary Line Input, 8" Celestion Speaker
DG15 – 15 Watt, Auxiliary Line Input, 10" Celestion Speaker
DG15R – 15 Watt, Auxiliary Line Input, 10" Celestion Speaker
DG30D – 30 Watt, Auxiliary Line Input, 12" Celestion Speaker
DG60R – 65 Watt, Auxiliary Line Input, 12" Celestion 70/80 Speaker
DG-65R/D – 65 Watt, Auxiliary Line Input, Eminence Redcoat Governor 12-inch speaker (discontinued)

Traynor Tube Guitar Amplifiers

 YGM-3 Reissue – Reissue of 1970s YGM-3, with tremolo and hand-wired circuitry. 20 watt class 'A' amp.  2 x EL84s, 4 x 12AX7s, 12 inch Jensen speaker.
 Custom Valve 20 – 15 watt class 'A' amp.  2 x EL84s, 3 x 12AX7s, 12 inch Celestion speaker.
 Custom Valve 20WR – Same as Custom Valve 20 but with red tolex, cream grill cloth, headphone jack, DI output, and Celestion Greenback Speaker.
 Custom Valve 40 – 40 watt class AB amp.  2 x 5881s, 3 x 12AX7s, and Celestion 70/80 Speaker
 Custom Valve 40WR – Same as Custom Valve 40 but with red tolex, cream grill cloth, Celestion Vintage 30 speaker.
 Custom Valve 40T – Same as Custom Valve 40 but with 2 x 10 inch Celestion speakers.
 Custom Valve 50BLUE – Same as Custom Valve 50B but with blue tolex. 
 Custom Valve 50B - 50 watt Class AB/PP. 2 x EL34 (BSTR), 3 x 12AX7 (WA). Two channels, Reverb Accutronix, 2 way Footswitch, 12' Celestion V30, Black tolex, Black grill cloth.
 Custom Special 50 – 50 watt class AB/15 watt class 'A' amp.  2 x 5881s, 3 x 12AX7s Channel Independent Tone Control, 12 inch Celestion speaker.
 Custom Valve 80 – 80 watt class AB amp.  4 x 5881s, 3 x 12AX7s, 2 x 12 inch Celestion 70/80 speakers
 Custom Valve 80Q – Same as Custom Valve 80, but with 4 x 10 inch Celestion speakers.
 Custom Special 90 – 90 watt class AB/20 watt class 'A' amp. 4 x 5881s, 3 x 12AX7s, Channel Independent Tone Control, 2 x 12 inch Celestion speaker.

Traynor Guitar Heads

 Custom Special 100H – Selectable 100-watt/30-watt output
 Custom Special 50H – Selectable 50-watt/15-watt output

Traynor Bass Amplifiers

 YBA 200-2 – A 200 watt bass head utilizing a quad of KT88's, 2 x 12AX7s and a 12AU7.
 YBA 300 - A 300 watt bass head utilizing 12 X 6L6GC's, 2 x 12AX7s and a 12AU7.
 DynaBass 400H – A 400 watt hybrid bass head with a solid state power amplifier, and selectable solid state or tube preamp with a 12AX7 tube.
 DynaBass 800H – An 800 watt version of the DynaBass 400H.

Traynor Guitar Extension Cabinets

 YCX12 – 40-watt, 1x12" Celestion speaker.
 YCX12WR – 40-watt, 1x12" Celestion speaker in Wine Red leatherette covering.
 YCX12BLUE – 40-watt, 1x12" Celestion speaker in Blue Nubtex covering.
 YCX212 – 160-watt, 2x12" Celestion speakers.
 YCS412 – 260-watt / Angled, 4x12" Celestion speakers, with versatile 4 or 16 ohm operation, or 2x8ohm stereo operation.
 YCS412V – 240-watt / 4x12-inch Angled, 4x12" Celestion G12T-75 speakers, with versatile 4 or 16 ohm operation, or 2x8ohm stereo operation.

References

External links
 Traynor Amplifiers website

Canadian brands
Audio amplifier manufacturers
Guitar amplifier manufacturers
Audio equipment manufacturers of Canada